Ahmet Cemal Eringen (February 15, 1921 – December 7, 2009) was a Turkish engineering scientist. He was a professor at Princeton University and the founder of the Society of Engineering Science. The Eringen Medal is named in his honor.

Education 
Eringen was born in Kayseri, Turkey and studied at the Technical University of Istanbul and graduated with a diploma degree in 1943 and then worked for the Turkish Aircraft Co. until 1944. In 1944–1945, he was a trainee at the Glenn L. Martin Company and in 1945 was group leader at the Turkish Air League Company. He continued his studies at the Polytechnic Institute of Brooklyn in New York City where he received his doctorate in applied mechanics in 1948 under the supervision of Nicholas J. Hoff.

Academic life 
He became assistant professor at the Illinois Institute of Technology in 1948, associate professor in 1953 and professor in 1955 at Purdue University. He was appointed as professor of aerospace and mechanical engineering at Princeton University in 1966. He became professor of continuum mechanics in the departments of civil and geological engineering and the program in applied and computational mathematics at Princeton University. He retired in 1991 as the dean of the School of Engineering and Applied Science at Princeton University and died in 2009. Eringen had been married since 1949 and had four children.

Research areas 
His work deals with continuum mechanics, electrodynamics of continua and material theories.

Awards 
In 1981 he received an honorary doctorate from the University of Glasgow (D.Sc.). In 1973 he received the Distinguished Service Award and the 1976 as named in his honor A. C. Eringen Medal of the Society of Engineering Science, whose president he was in 1963 to 1973.

Writings 

 Nonlocal Continuum Field Theories, Springer Verlag, 2002
 Microcontinuum Field Theories, volume 1, Springer Verlag, 1999
 Microcontinuum Field Theories II Fluent Media 1st Edition, Springer 2001
 with Erhan Kıral: Constitutive Equations of Nonlinear Electromagnetic-Elastic Crystals, Springer Verlag, 1990
 with Gérard A. Maugin: Electrodynamics of Continua, 2 volumes, Springer Verlag, 1989
 Continuum Physics (Editor): Continuum Physics, 4 volumes, Academic Press, 1974-1976
 with Erdoğan S. Suhubi: Elastodynamics, volume 1, Academic Press, 1974-1975
 with Erdoğan S. Suhubi: Elastodynamics: Linear Theory volume 2, Academic Press, 1974-1975
 Foundations of Micropolar Thermoelasticity: Course held at the Department for Mechanics of Deformable Bodies July 1970 (CISM International Centre for Mechanical Sciences) 1970th Edition
 Theory of Micropolar Elasticity in Microcontinuum Field Theories, Springer Verlag, 1970
 Mechanics of Continua, Wiley, 1967
 Nonlinear Theory of Continuous Media, McGraw Hill, 1962
 with Roy C. Dixon: A dynamical theory of polar elastic dielectrics, 1964

References 

Istanbul Technical University alumni
Polytechnic Institute of New York University alumni
Purdue University faculty
Illinois Institute of Technology faculty
Princeton University faculty
Engineering academics
Mechanical engineers
1921 births
2009 deaths
Turkish materials scientists
American materials scientists
American academics of Turkish descent
Turkish emigrants to the United States